Mansurpur is a village in Phillaur tehsil of Jalandhar District of Punjab State, India. It is located 4 km away from postal head office Bara Pind. The village is 6 km away from Goraya,  9 km from Phillaur, 39 km from Jalandhar, and 121 km from state capital Chandigarh. The village is administrated by a Sarpanch, who is the elected representative of the village. Sidhu, Dhaliwal, Mall, Jandu, Sandhu are main gotra in the village.

Demographics 
According to the 2011 Census, The village has a population of 1273. 651 are males, while 622 are females. Mansurpur has a literacy rate of 80.94%, higher than the average literacy rate of Punjab.

Most villagers belong to a Schedule Caste (SC), comprising 72.58% of the total.

Education 
Mansurpur has a co-ed upper primary with Secondary school which was founded in 1972. Schools in Mansurpur provide a mid-day meal as per the Indian Midday Meal Scheme.

Transport

Rail 
Ludhiana Junction railway station is 24 km away from the village however Bhatian train station is located 3 km away.

Air 
The nearest domestic airport is 41 km away in Ludhiana and the nearest international airport is 134 km away in Amritsar other nearest international airport is located in Chandigarh.

References 

Villages in Jalandhar district
Villages in Phillaur tehsil